The English progressive rock band Yes has toured for five decades.

The band's longest break in touring came from late 2004 through late 2008. Touring has tended to focus on the UK and the rest of Europe, North America and Japan, but the band have also played other parts of the world, notably Australia.

Masterworks Tour

Setlist:

 "Close to the Edge" (Anderson, Howe)
 "Starship Trooper" (Anderson, Squire, Howe)
 "The Gates of Delirium" (Anderson, Squire, Howe, White, Moraz)
 "Leaves of Green" (Anderson, Squire, Howe, Wakeman, White)
 "Heart of the Sunrise" (Anderson, Squire, Bruford)
 "Ritual (Nous Sommes du Soleil)" (Anderson, Squire, Howe, Wakeman, White)
 "I've Seen All Good People" (Anderson, Squire) (Added on 21 June 2000)
 "Roundabout" (Anderson, Howe)

Magnification Tour

Setlist:

 "Give Love Each Day" (Anderson, Squire, Howe, White)
 "Close to the Edge" (Anderson, Howe)
 "Long Distance Runaround" (Anderson)
 "Don't Go" (Anderson, Squire, Howe, White)
 "In the Presence Of" (Anderson, Squire, Howe, White)
 "The Gates of Delirium" (Anderson, Squire, Howe, White, Moraz)
 "Wonderous Stories" (Anderson) (Dropped after 29 August 2001)
 "Perpetual Change" (Anderson, Squire) (Dropped after 27 October 2001)
 "Steve Howe solo section" (Howe) (Added on 30 July 2001)
 "Starship Trooper" (Anderson, Squire, Howe)
 "Magnification" (Anderson, Squire, Howe, White) (Added on 19 November 2001)
 "And You and I" (Anderson, Squire, Howe, Bruford)
 "Ritual (Nous Sommes du Soleil)" (Anderson, Squire, Howe, Wakeman, White)
 "I've Seen All Good People" (Anderson, Squire)
 "Roundabout" (Anderson, Howe)
"Owner Of A Lonely Heart" was also occasionally played.

Full Circle Tour

Setlist:

 "Siberian Khatru" (Anderson, Howe, Wakeman) 
 "Magnification" (Anderson, Squire, Howe, White)
 "America" (Simon) (Dropped after 25 August 2002)
 "Don't Kill the Whale" (Anderson, Squire)
 "In the Presence Of" (Anderson, Squire, Howe, White)
 "We Have Heaven" (Anderson)
 "South Side of the Sky" (Anderson, Squire)
 "The Revealing Science of God (Dance of the Dawn)" (Anderson, Squire, Howe, Wakeman, White) (Dropped after 25 August 2002)
 "Close to the Edge" (Anderson, Howe) (Played from 24 October 2002 to 8 December 2002)
 "And You and I" (Anderson, Squire, Howe, Bruford) (Dropped from 31 October 2002 to 3 June 2003)
 Steve Howe solo section (Howe)
 "Show Me" (Anderson)
 Wakeman solo (Wakeman)
 "Heart of the Sunrise" (Anderson, Squire, Bruford)
 "Long Distance Runaround / Whitefish" (Anderson, Squire)
 "Awaken" (Anderson, Howe)
 "I've Seen All Good People" (Anderson, Squire) (Added on 24 June 2003)
 "Roundabout" (Anderson, Howe) (Dropped between 12 November 2002 and 3 June 2003)
 "Yours Is No Disgrace" (Anderson, Squire, Howe, Kaye, Bruford) (Dropped after 25 August 2002)
 "Starship Trooper" (Anderson, Squire, Howe) (Added on 24 October 2002)
Also occasionally played were:
 "Nine Voices (Longwalker)" (Anderson, Squire, Howe, White, Sherwood, Khoroshev) (Played on 21 November 2002)
 "Owner of a Lonely Heart" (Anderson, Rabin, Squire, Horn) (Played on 15, 16, and 27 September 2003)

35th Anniversary Tour

Setlist:

 "Going for the One" (Anderson)
 "Sweet Dreams" (Anderson, Foster)
 "I've Seen All Good People" (Anderson, Squire)
 "America" (Simon) (Added starting on 20 August 2004)
 "Close to the Edge" (Anderson, Howe) (Played from 20 August 2004 to 31 August 2004)
 "Mind Drive" (Anderson, Squire, Howe, Wakeman, White) (Dropped after 22 August 2004)
 "South Side of the Sky" (Anderson, Squire)
 "Turn of the Century" (Anderson, Howe, White) (Dropped after 23 June 2004)
 "Yours Is No Disgrace" (Anderson, Squire, Howe, Kaye, Bruford)
 "The Meeting" (Anderson, Howe, Wakeman, Bruford) (Dropped after 23 June 2004)
 "Long Distance Runaround" (Anderson) 
 "Wonderous Stories" (Anderson)
 "Time Is Time" (Anderson, Squire, Howe, White) (Dropped after 23 June 2004)
 "Roundabout" (Anderson, Howe)
 "Show Me" (Anderson) (Dropped after 23 June 2004)
 "Owner of a Lonely Heart" (Anderson, Rabin, Squire, Horn) (Added on 10 May 2004)
 Steve Howe solo section (Howe)
 "Rhythm of Love" (Kaye, Rabin, Squire, Anderson; Anderson, Howe) (Replaced by "Awaken" on 17 August 2004)
 "And You and I" (Anderson, Squire, Howe, Bruford)
 "Ritual (Nous Sommes du Soleil)" (Anderson, Squire, Howe, Wakeman, White) (Dropped after 23 June 2004)
 "Every Little Thing" (Lennon-McCartney) (Dropped after 15 May 2004)
 "Soon" (Anderson) (Dropped after 13 May 2004)
 "Starship Trooper" (Anderson, Squire, Howe) (Added on 12 May 2004)
Also occasionally played were:
 "Don't Kill the Whale" (Anderson, Squire) (Played on 27 August 2004, 28 August 2004, 2 September 2004, and 3 September 2004)
 "Time and a Word" (Anderson, Foster) (Played on 11 September 2004)
 Wakeman solo/"Morning has Broken" (Wakeman) (Played on 11 July 2004)
 "Whitefish" (White, Squire) (Played on 13 June 2004, 7 July 2004, 8 July 2004, 10 July 2004, and 12 July 2004)
 "Nine Voices (Longwalker)" (Anderson, Squire, Howe, White, Sherwood, Khoroshev) (Played on 15 April 2004, 4 May 2004, and 11 July 2004)

A Yes consisting of Chris Squire, Steve Howe, Alan White, Trevor Rabin and Geoff Downes (with Trevor Horn on backing vocals) appeared as one of several acts at the November 2004 "Produced By Trevor Horn: A Concert For The Prince's Trust" at Wembley Arena in London. They performed "Cinema" and "Owner of a Lonely Heart".

Close to the Edge and Back (40th Anniversary) Tour (cancelled)
In 2007, the band planned summer 2008 dates as the Close to the Edge and Back tour, with Jon Anderson, Chris Squire, Steve Howe and Alan White being joined by Oliver Wakeman on keyboards, as a replacement for (as suggested by) his father, Rick Wakeman. However, Anderson suffered acute respiratory failure before the tour, which had to be cancelled. With Anderson out of action recuperating, Squire, Howe and White went on tour with Oliver Wakeman and replacement vocalist Benoît David (from Canadian band Mystery). The tour resumed under the name "In the Present Tour" on 4 November 2008 in Hamilton, Ontario, Canada with the two new musicians (see below).

In the Present Tour
An initial North America leg #2 started on 12 February 2009 was cut short when Squire suffered a medical emergency.

Usually performed songs:
 "Roundabout"
 "And You and I"
 "Tempus Fugit"
 "Owner of a Lonely Heart"
 "I've Seen All Good People"
 "Starship Trooper"
 "Siberian Khatru"
 "Astral Traveller"
 "Machine Messiah"
 "Heart of the Sunrise"
Sometimes performed songs:
 "Onward"
 "Yours Is No Disgrace"
 "Close the Edge"
 "South Side of the Sky"
 "Clap
 "Perpetual Change"
 "Mood for a Day"
 "Long Distance Runaround"
 "The Fish (Schindleria Praematurus)"
 "Aliens (Are Only Us From the Future)"

Occasionally performed songs:
 "Second Initial" (played on 16 November 2008, 6 December 2008, 5 February 2009, 15, 16, 20 July 2009, 4, 6, 29 November 2009, 12 December 2009, 2, 14 February 2010, 9, 11 June 2010, 3 December 2010)
 "Parallels" (dropped after 25 November 2008)
 "Soon" (dropped after 26 November 2008, omitted on 19 November 2008)
 "Masquerade" (played on 12 November 2008, 6 December 2008, 2 August 2009, 2, 14 February 2010, 5 April 2010, 3 December 2010)
 "Leaves of Green" (played on 26, 29 June 2010)
 "To Be Over" (played on 23 November 2008, 9 December 2008)
 "Turn of the Century" (played on 20 June 2010)

Covers: 
 "Intersection Blues" (played on 15, 18 November 2008, 7 December 2008, 2 August 2009, 4, 5 February 2010, 25 June 2010, 19, 23, 27 November 2010)
 "Classical Gas" (played on 16 November 2008, 14 December 2008, 4, 6, 26 November 2009, 30 June 2010, 3 July 2010)
 "Corkscrew" (played on 9 November 2008, 3 December 2008, 2, 17, 29 November 2009, 1 December 2009)
 "In the Course of the Day" (played on 14 November 2008, 3 December 2008, 30 October 2009, 5 December 2009, 16, 18 June 2010)
 "The Little Galliard" (played on 25 November 2008, 11 November 2009, 4, 5 February 2010, 25, 28 November 2010)
 "Concerto in D (2nd Movement)" (played on 19 November 2008, 9 December 2008, 8 July 2009, 4 December 2009, 27 June 2010)
 "Ram" (played on 22 November 2008, 14 December 2008, 7 November 2009, 12 June 2010, 4 December 2010)
 "Sketches in the Sun" (played on 9 November 2008, 1 August 2009, 2, 17 November 2009, 4 December 2010)
 "Cactus Boogie" (played on 12, 18 November 2008, 26 November 2009, 9 February 2010)
 "Winter, 2nd movement" (played on 22 November 2008, 22 July 2009, 16, 18 June 2010)
 "J's Theme" (played on 15 November 2008, 7 December 2008, 7 November 2009)
 "Surface Tension" (played on 10 December 2008, 10 November 2009, 1 November 2009)
 "The Valley of Rocks" (played on 26, 29 November 2008, 8 November 2009)
 "Australia" (played on 11 November 2008, 5 December 2008)
 "Bareback" (played on 5 December 2008, 13 February 2010)
 "Cat Napping" (played on 26 December 2008, 21 February 2010)
 "Country Mix" (played on 25 November 2008, 31 July 2009)
 "Diary of a Man Who Vanished" (played on 19 November 2008, 11 November 2009)
 "Golden Mean" (played on 11 November 2008, 8 February 2010)
 "Laughing With Larry" (played on 10 November 2008, 30 November 2009)
 "Pyramidology" (played on 23 November 2008, 21 November 2010)
 "Solar Winds" (played on 29 November 2008, 12 December 2009)
 "All's A Chord" (played on 30 November 2008)
 "Arada" (played on 25 November 2008)
 "Aria (Cantinela) (played on 28 November 2010)
 "Beginnings" (played on 19 November 2009)
 "Georgia's Theme" (played on 31 July 2009)
 "Heritage" (played on 28 November 2008)
 "Hint Hint" (played on 19 November 2009)
 "Meadow Rag" (played on 28 November 2008)
 "Mint Julep" (played on 21 February 2010)
 "Provence" (played on 8 February 2010)
 "Smile" (played on 11 November 2009)
 "The Glory of Love" (played on 2 December 2008)
 "Trambone" (played on 10 December 2008)
 "Wayward Course" (played on 9 February 2010)

Rite of Spring and Fly From Here Tours 2011–2012
Oliver Wakeman on keyboards through May 2011; Geoff Downes took over from July 2011 onwards. Jon Davison took over on vocals for 2012 onwards.

Usually played songs:
 "Fly From Here, Part I: We Can Fly"
 "I've Seen All Good People"
 "Roundabout"
 "Tempus Fugit"
 "Yours Is No Disgrace"
 "Heart of the Sunrise"
 Fly From Here Overture - Part 5
 "Starship Trooper"
 "Wonderous Stories"
 "And You and I"
Sometimes played songs:
 "Owner of a Lonely Heart"
 "Into the Storm"
 "Solitare"
 "Life on a Flim Set"
 "Awaken"
 "America"
 "Clap"
 "Leaves of Green"
Other:
 "To Be Over" (played on 13 November 2011)
 "Mood for a Day" (played on 15, 20, 24, 28 July 2012, 21 August 2012)
 "Machine Messiah" (played on 4 August 2011, 3, 5, 9, 12, 15, 17, 20, 23, 25 November 2011, 4 December 2012, 18 April 2012)
Cover:
 "Trambone" (played on 17 November 2011)
 "The Little Galliard" (played on 18 August 2012)
 "Ram" (played on 18 April 2012)
 "Provence" (played on 27 July 2012)
 "Laughing With Larry" (played on 17 April 2012)
 "Country Mix" (played on 29 July 2012)
 "Classical Guitar Mix" (played on 31 July 2012)
 "Australia" (played on 11 April 2012)
 "A Whiter Shade of Pale" (played on 29 July 2012)
 "The Valley of Rocks" (played on 24, 27 July 2012)
 "Sketches in the Sun" (played on 21 April 2012, 14 July 2012)
 "Intersection Blues" (played on 6 December 2011, 2 August 2012)
 "Cactus Boogie" (played on 25, 30 November 2011)
 "Cantata No. 140 (Wachet Auf)" (played on 7, 10, 14, 21 August 2012)
 "Second Initial" (played on 9 November 2011, 5, 19 April 2012, 21 July 2012, 7, 18 August 2012)
 "In the Course of the Day" (played on 16, 24 November 2011, 13 April 2012, 18, 25 July 2012, 4, 6, 14 August 2012)

Three Album Tour 2013–2014

During the Three Album Tour, Yes were playing three classic albums a night: The Yes Album, Close to the Edge and Going for the One in full. Only five shows performed in casinos (*) featured only two albums, The Yes Album and Close to the Edge (followed by "Roundabout" as the encore track), due to venue time restrictions. The two shows performed during the "Cruise to the Edge" festival also featured only two albums but not the same couple of albums and not the same encore track. It was announced on Billy Sherwood's Facebook page that a DVD of the Three Album Tour was being made and that Sherwood was mixing it. The resulting album, entitled Like It Is: Yes at the Bristol Hippodrome, included The Yes Album and Going for the One and excluded the Close to the Edge album.

Typical Set List 
Intro (Igor Stravinsky's "Firebird Suite")
Close to the Edge album: 
"Close to the Edge" (Anderson, Howe)
"And You and I" (Anderson, Bowe, Bruford, Squire)
"Siberian Khatru" (Anderson, Howe, Wakeman)
Going for the One album:
"Going for the One" (Anderson)
"Turn of the Century" (Anderson, Howe, White)
"Parallels" (Squire)
"Wonderous Stories" (Anderson)
"Awaken" (Anderson, Howe)
The Yes Album:  
"Yours Is No Disgrace" (Anderson, Squire, Howe, Kaye, Bruford)
"Clap" (Howe)
"Starship Trooper" (Anderson, Howe, Squire)
"I've Seen All Good People" (Anderson, Squire)
"A Venture" (Anderson)
"Perpetual Change" (Anderson, Squire)
Encore:
"Roundabout" (Anderson, Howe)

Heaven & Earth Tour 2014–2015

United States Summer tour 2014 
Every night of their Heaven & Earth U.S. Summer tour 2014, Yes are playing live material from the new studio album Heaven & Earth and performing in their entirety the two classic albums 1971's Fragile and 1972's Close to the Edge followed by an encore of their greatest hits.

Typical Set List from 5 July (in Nichols, New York) to 13 July 2014 (in Newport, Rhode Island) and from 18 July 2014 (in Salamanca, New York) to 24 August 2014 (in Los Angeles, California)

Intro (Benjamin Britten's "Young Person's Guide to the Orchestra") 
Close to the Edge album :
"Siberian Khatru" (Anderson, Howe, Wakeman) 
"And You and I" (Anderson, Howe, Bruford, Squire) 
"Close to the Edge" (Anderson, Howe) 
Songs from the Heaven & Earth album:
"Believe Again" (Jon Davison, Howe) 
"To Ascend" (Davison, White) 
"The Game" (Squire, Davison, Gerard Johnson) 
Fragile album:
"Roundabout" (Anderson, Howe) 
"Cans and Brahms" (Johannes Brahms, arr. by Wakeman) 
"We Have Heaven" (Anderson) 
"South Side of the Sky" (Anderson, Squire) 
"Five Per Cent for Nothing" (Bruford) 
"Long Distance Runaround" (Anderson) 
"The Fish (Schindleria Praematurus)" (Squire) 
"Mood for a Day" (Howe) 
"Heart of the Sunrise" (Anderson, Squire, Bruford) 
The Yes Album Encore:
"I've Seen All Good People" (Anderson, Squire)  
Greatest Hits Encore: 
"Owner of a Lonely Heart" (Rabin, Anderson, Squire, Horn) 
"Starship Trooper" (Anderson, Howe, Squire) 

Typical Set List on 15 July (in Washington, D.C.) and 16 July 2014 (in Hampton, New Hampshire)
 Intro (Benjamin Britten's "Young Person's Guide to the Orchestra")
Fragile album:
 "Roundabout" (Anderson, Howe)
 "Cans and Brahms" (Brahms, arr. by Wakeman)
 "We Have Heaven" (Anderson)
 "South Side of the Sky" (Anderson, Squire)
 "Five Per Cent for Nothing" (Bruford)
 "Long Distance Runaround" (Anderson)
 "The Fish (Schindleria Praematurus)" (Squire)
 "Mood for a Day" (Howe)
 "Heart of the Sunrise" (Anderson, Squire, Bruford)
Songs from the Heaven & Earth album:
 "To Ascend" (Davison, White)
 "The Game" (Squire, Davison, Johnson)
Close to the Edge album :
 "Siberian Khatru" (Anderson, Howe, Wakeman)
 "And You and I" (Anderson, Howe, Bruford, Squire)
 "Close to the Edge" (Anderson, Howe)
The Yes Album Encore:
"I've Seen All Good People" (Anderson, Squire)
 "Starship Trooper" (Anderson, Squire)

Australia & New Zealand Fall tour 2014 
Every night of their Heaven & Earth Australia & New Zealand Fall tour 2014, Yes will perform in their entirety the two classic albums 1971's Fragile and 1972's Close to the Edge and will play excerpts from the new studio album Heaven & Earth plus some of their Greatest Hits.

Typical Set List starting from 10 November 2014 (in Auckland, New Zealand) 

Intro (Benjamin Britten's "Young Person's Guide to the Orchestra") 
Close to the Edge album :
"Close to the Edge" (Anderson, Howe) 
"And You and I" (Anderson, Howe, Bruford, Squire) 
"Siberian Khatru" (Anderson, Howe, Wakeman) 
Songs from the Heaven & Earth album:
"Believe Again" (Davison, Howe) 
"The Game" (Davison, Squire, Johnson) 
Fragile album:
"Roundabout" 
"Cans and Brahms" 
"We Have Heaven" 
"South Side of the Sky" 
"Five Per Cent for Nothing" 
"Long Distance Runaround" 
"The Fish (Schindleria Praematurus)" 
"Mood for a Day" 
"Heart of the Sunrise" 
The Yes Album Encore:
"I've Seen All Good People" 
Greatest Hits Encore: 
"Owner of a Lonely Heart"

Japan Fall tour 2014 
After the Australia & New Zealand tour, Yes had embarked in November 2014 on a tour of Japan, still playing the Fragile and Close To The Edge albums in their entirety plus some greatest hits and songs from their new album Heaven & Earth. The show on 29 November 2014 in Tokyo would become the band's final performance with Chris Squire before his passing the following summer on 27 June 2015.

North American Tours 2015

North American Summer Tour 2015 
On 6 April 2015, Yes and Toto announced that they would embark in Summer 2015 on a joint tour of North America.

On 19 May 2015, Yes announced that Chris Squire was suffering from acute erythroid leukemia and that, due to this, former member Billy Sherwood would be covering Squire's role in the band on (previously announced) live dates in 2015, i.e. their North American Summer 2015 joint tour with Toto from August to September 2015, as well as their performances on the latest "Cruise to the Edge" festival in November 2015. Squire subsequently died on 27 June 2015. Their Mashantucket, Connecticut show on 7 August 2015 was the first time in the history of Yes that the band would perform without Squire, 47 years since the band's creation.

Typical Set List 
"Onward" (Squire)  
"Firebird Suite" (Excerpt) (Stravinsky) 
"Don't Kill the Whale" (Anderson, Squire)
"Tempus Fugit" (Downes, Horn, Howe, Squire, White)
"America" (Simon) 
"Going for the One" (Anderson)
"Time and a Word" (Anderson, Foster)
"Clap" (Howe) 
"I've Seen All Good People" (Anderson, Squire)
"Siberian Khatru" (Anderson, Howe, Wakeman)
"Owner of a Lonely Heart" (Rabin, Anderson, Squire, Horn)
"Roundabout" (Anderson, Howe)
Encore:
"Starship Trooper" (Anderson, Howe, Squire)

Other:
 "Nine Voices (Longwalker)" (played on 11 August 2015)

North American Fall Tour 2015 

Typical Set List 
"Onward" (Squire)  
"Firebird Suite" (excerpt) (Stravinsky) 
"Siberian Khatru" (Anderson, Howe, Wakeman)
"Believe Again" (Davison, Howe)
"Going for the One" (Anderson)
"White Car" (Downes, Horn, Howe, Squire, White)
"Tempus Fugit" (Downes, Horn, Howe, Squire, White)
"America" (Simon) 
"Nine Voices" (Anderson, Howe, Sherwood, Squire, White, Khoroshev)
"Time and a Word" (Anderson, Foster)
"Clap" (Howe) 
"Don't Kill the Whale" (Anderson, Squire)
"Soon" (Anderson, Squire, Howe, White, Moraz) 
"I've Seen All Good People" (Anderson, Squire)   
"Owner of a Lonely Heart" (Rabin, Anderson, Squire, Horn)
"Roundabout" (Anderson, Howe)
Encore:
"Starship Trooper" (Anderson, Howe, Squire)

Albums Tour 2016–2017

UK & European Spring Tour 2016 
Yes have advertised this leg of the tour as featuring their albums Fragile (1971) & Drama (1980) played in their entirety. A selection of their greatest hits complete these two albums.  Trevor Horn joined the band on stage to sing lead vocal on the 'Drama' song "Tempus Fugit" for their Oxford and London dates.

Typical Set List

Set #1: 
Intro 

Drama album:
"Machine Messiah" 
"Man In A White Car" 
"Does It Really Happen" 
"Into The Lens" 
"Run Through The Light" 
"Tempus Fugit" 

Encore:
"Time And A Word" 
"Siberian Khatru"

Intermission

Set #2: 
"Don't Kill the Whale" 
"Going For The One" 
"Soon" 
"Owner of a Lonely Heart" 

Fragile album:
"Roundabout" 
"Cans and Brahms" 
"We Have Heaven" 
"South Side of the Sky" 
"Five Per Cent for Nothing" 
"Long Distance Runaround" 
"The Fish (Schindleria Praematurus)" 
"Mood for a Day" 
"Heart of the Sunrise" 

Encore:
"Don't Kill the Whale" 
"Owner of a Lonely Heart" 
"Starship Trooper"

US Summer Tour 2016 
Yes have advertised this leg of the tour as featuring their albums Drama (1980) and sides 1 & 4 ("The Revealing Science of God" and "Ritual") of Tales From Topographic Oceans (1973) played in their entirety along with a selection of their greatest hits.

Having undergone surgery to repair his back, Yes drummer Alan White was not able to rejoin Yes's US Summer Tour 2016. As a result, his «good friend» United States drummer Jay Schellen (from Hurricane, Asia and GPS) started performing with the band, replacing him on drums during the Summer tour.

Typical Set List

Set #1: 
Intro 

Drama album:
"Machine Messiah" 
"Man In A White Car" 
"Does It Really Happen" 
"Into The Lens" 
"Run Through The Light" 
"Tempus Fugit" 
"Time And A Word" 
"Siberian Khatru"

Set #2: 
"And You And I"
"The Revealing Science of God (Dance of the Dawn)"  
"Leaves Of Green" (excerpt from "The Ancient (Giants Under the Sun)"  
"Ritual (Nous Sommes du Soleil)" 

Encore:
"Roundabout" 
"Starship Trooper"

Japan Fall Tour 2016 
In September 2016, Yes announced a 6-date Japanese Tour for November 2016, playing Yessongs (1973) and sides 1 & 4 of Tales From Topographic Oceans (1973). On 14 October 2016, Yes announced that Alan White would rejoin the band for the November 2016 Japan Tour & the February 2017 "Cruise To The Edge" Prog Rock Festival.

Setlist:
Set 1a (Selections from "Drama"):
 "Machine Messiah"
 "White Car"
 "Tempus Fugit"
Set 1b (Selections from "Yessongs"):
 "I've Seen All Good People"
 "Perpetual Change"
 "And You and I"
 "Heart of the Sunrise"
Set 2 (Selections from "Tales From Topographic Oceans"):
 "The Revealing Science of God (Dance of the Dawn)"
 "Leaves of Green"
 "Ritual (Nous sommes du soleli)"
Encore:
 "Roundabout"
 "Starship Trooper"

US Summer Tour 2017 
Setlist is same as above but with some differences

Set 1 (Drama):
 "Machine Messiah"
 "White Car"
 "Does It Really Happen?" 
 "Into the Lens"
 "Run Through the Light"
 "Tempus Fugit"
 "And You and I" (omitted on 8, 17 February 2017)
 "Perpetual Change" (played on 11, 14, 18 February 2017)
 "Heart of the Sunrise" (played on 3, 12, 15, 19 February 2017)
Set 2:
 "The Revealing Science of God (Dance of the Dawn)"
 "Leaves of Green"
 "Ritaul (Nous sommes du soleli)"
Encore:
 "Roundabout"
 "Starship Trooper" (played on 7, 8, 11, 12, 14, 15, 18, 19 February 2017)
 "Heat of the Moment" (In memory of John Wetton) (played on 8, 11, 12, 14, 15, 18, 19 February 2017)

ARW's An Evening of Yes Music and More Tour – 2016–2017

Yes's North American "Yestival" (Summer) Tour 2017 
The tour featured Steve Howe's son Dylan as second drummer; On 11 September 2017, the band announced that due to the unexpected death of Virgil Howe, Steve's son and Dylan's brother, the rest of the tour, including their concert at Moorhead the same day, were cancelled.

Typical Set List

Intro ("Young Person's Guide To The Orchestra") 
"Survival" 
"Time & A Word" 
"Yours Is No Disgrace" 
"South Side Of The Sky" 
"And You And I" 
"Leaves of Green" 
"Soon" 
"Going For The One" 
"Don't Kill The Whale" 
"Machine Messiah" 
Encore:
"Madrigal"  (omitted on 4, 7, 8, 23, 26 August 2017)
"Roundabout" 
"Starship Trooper"  (played on 5, 7, 10, 28 August 2018, 1, 5, 7, 8 September 2017)

About the cancellation of the Yestival tour remaining dates:

Yes's Cruise to the Edge 2018

Yes's UK, Europe, and North America "50th Anniversary" Spring/Summer Tour 2018 

Sources:

Typical Set List

European Leg

Set #1:
Intro 
"Yours Is No Disgrace" 
"I've Seen All Good People" 
"Sweet Dreams" 
"South Side of the Sky"  (omitted on 25 March 2018)
"Onward"  (omitted on 18, 30 March 2018)
"Clap" (played on 20–23 March 2018)
"Mood for a Day"  
"Wonderous Stories" 
"Parallels" 
"And You and I" 

Set #2:
"The Revealing Science of God (Dance of the Dawn)" 
"Leaves of Green"  
"Ritual (Nous sommes du soleil)" 

Encore:
"Roundabout" 
"Starship Trooper" 

American Leg

Set #1:
"Close to the Edge" 
"Nine Voices (Longwalker)" 
"Parallels" 
"Second Initial" (played on 21–28 July 2018)
"Madrigal" (played on 21–28 July 2018)
"Mood for a Day" 
"Leaves of Green"  
"Fly From Here, Part I: We Can Fly" 
"Sweet Dreams" 
"Heart of the Sunrise" 
Set #2:
"Perpetual Change" 
"Does It Really Happen?" 
"Soon"  
"Believe Again" (played on 5, 6 June 2018)
"Awaken" 
Encore:
"Yours Is No Disgrace" 
"Roundabout" 
"Starship Trooper"

Yes Featuring Jon Anderson, Trevor Rabin, Rick Wakeman's Quintessential Yes: The 50th Anniversary Tour – Spring/Summer 2018 

Quintessential Yes: The 50th Anniversary Tour was a Spring/Summer 2018 concert tour by the rock band Yes Featuring Jon Anderson, Trevor Rabin, Rick Wakeman and their second and final tour. It followed their 2016-17 An Evening of Yes Music and More tour. During the tour, the band performed at the Stone Free Festival at The O2 Arena in London.

Personnel
Yes featuring Jon Anderson, Trevor Rabin and Rick Wakeman
Jon Anderson – lead vocals, acoustic guitar
Trevor Rabin – lead guitar, backing and lead vocals
Rick Wakeman – keyboards

Additional musicians
Iain Hornal – bass, backing vocals (European dates)
Lee Pomeroy – bass, backing vocals (US Dates)
Lou Molino III – drums, percussion, backing vocals

Setlist 

Setlist:

 "Cinema"
 "Hold On"
 "South Side of the Sky" (dropped after June 17, 2018)
 "And You and I"
 "Changes"
 "Perpetual Change"
 "I've Seen All Good People"
 "Rhythm of Love"
 "Lift Me Up" (added starting August 26, 2018)
 "I Am Waiting"
 "Heart of the Sunrise"
 "Awaken"
 "Owner of a Lonely Heart"
 "Roundabout"

Tour dates
The following tour dates are taken from the band's official website.

Yes's Cruise to the Edge 2019

Yes's Japan "50th Anniversary" Winter Tour 2019 

Sources:

Setlist 1 (19 - 22 February 2019)
Set 1:
 "Firebird Suite" (Igor Stravinsky)
 "Parallels"
 "Sweet Dreams"
 "Fly From Here, Part I: We Can Fly"
 "Nine Voices (Longwalker)"
 "Clap"
 "Madrigal"
 "Yours Is No Disgrace"
Close to the Edge:
 "Close to the Edge"
 "And You and I"
 "Siberian Khatru"
Encore:
 "No Opportunity Necessary, No Experience Needed"
 "Roundabout"
 "Starship Trooper"

Setlist 2 (23 February 2019) 
Set 1:
 "Firebird Suite"
 "Close to the Edge"
 "Nine Voices (Longwalker)"
 "Parallels"
 "Clap"
 "Madrigal"
 "Fly From Here, Part I: We Can Fly"
 "Sweet Dreams"
 "Heart of the Sunrise"
Set 2:
 "Perpetual Change"
 "Does It Really Happen?"
 "Soon"
 "Yours Is No Disgrace"
Encore:
 "No Opportunity Necessary, No Experience Needed"
 "Roundabout"
 "Starship Trooper"

Setlist 3 (24 February 2019) 
Set 1:
 "Firebird Suite"
 "Close to the Edge"
 "Nine Voices (Longwalker)"
 "Parallels"
 "Madrigal"
 "Fly From Here, Part I: We Can Fly"
 "Sweet Dreams"
 "Heart of the Sunrise"
Set 2:
 "Yours Is No Disgrace"
 "Clap"
 "Starship Trooper"
 "I've Seen All Good People"
 "Clap"
 "Perpetual Change"
Encore:
 "No Opportunity Necessary, No Experience Needed"
 "Roundabout"

Yes's (Summer 2019 North American) Royal Affair Tour 
The Royal Affair Tour was a Yes 28-date Summer 2019 North American joint tour with Asia, John Lodge (of The Moody Blues), Carl Palmer's ELP Legacy (featuring Arthur Brown on guest vocals) and Guns N' Roses guitarist Ron "Bumblefoot" Thal. The tour started on 12 June 2019 in Bethlehem, Pennsylvania and ended on 28 July 2019 in Saratoga, California. Yes's guitarist Steve Howe rejoined Asia for a portion of their live set. The initial dates of the Royal Affair Tour are as follows.

Typical Set List
Intro 
"No Opportunity Necessary, No Experience Needed" 
"America"  
"Going for the One" 
"I've Seen All Good People" 
"Clap"  
"Siberian Khatru" 
"Onward" 
"Tempus Fugit"  
"Rhythm of Love"  
"The Gates of Delirium" 
Encore:
"Imagine" 
"Roundabout" 
"Starship Trooper"  

Other:
 "Ram" (played on 16 July 2019)
 "Masquerade" (played on 16 July 2019)
 "Intersection Blues (played on 18 July 2019)
 "Country Mix" (played on 26 July 2019)
 "Cactus Boogie" (played on 15 June 2019)
 "Sketches in the Sun" (played on 12, 14 June 2019)
 "In the Course of the Day" (played on 22 June 2019, 5 July 2019)

Notes

References

External links
Yesworld: The Official Yes website Past & present versions
Forgotten Yesterdays (A Comprehensive Guide To Yes Shows)

2000s
2000s-related lists
2010s-related lists
Lists of concert tours